Ruslan Anvarovich Yunusov (born 16 May 1999) is a Russian football player who plays as a goalkeeper for Sakhalin. He also holds Tajikistani citizenship.

Club career
He made his debut in the Russian Football National League for Chayka Peschanokopskoye on 16 August 2020 in a game against Krylia Sovetov Samara.

References

External links
 
 Profile by Russian Football National League
 

1999 births
Sportspeople from Krasnoyarsk
Living people
Russian footballers
Association football goalkeepers
FC Yenisey Krasnoyarsk players
FC Irtysh Omsk players
FC Chayka Peschanokopskoye players
FC Chita players
FC Sakhalin Yuzhno-Sakhalinsk players
Russian First League players
Russian Second League players